Apep is a triple star system containing a Wolf–Rayet binary and a hot supergiant, located in the constellation of Norma. Named after the serpent deity from Egyptian mythology, the star system is surrounded by a vast complex of stellar wind and cosmic dust thrown into space by the high rotation speed of the binary's primary star and formed into a "pinwheel" shape by the secondary star's influence. Ground-based studies of the system in the 2010s concluded that the system was the best known gamma-ray burst progenitor candidate in the Milky Way galaxy.

Nomenclature 
Apep, pronounced , was named by a team of astronomers led by Joseph Callingham of ASTRON, who studied the system between 2016 and 2018 and published a scientific paper on their observations. It was named after the eponymous mortal enemy of the deity of the sun Ra in Egyptian mythology, who was often illustrated as a giant serpent; their rivalry was described as "an apt allusion" to the appearance of the system and its stellar wind in infrared as "a star embattled within a dragon’s coils". In the XMM-Newton Serendipitous Source Catalogue (2XMM), a star catalog of X-ray sources observed by the XMM-Newton space telescope, the system is catalogued as 2XMM J160050.7–514245. It is also known as WR 70-16.

Characteristics 
Apep is a triple star system containing a Wolf–Rayet binary described as the "central engine", orbiting with a period of ~100 years, and a third hot supergiant star described as the "northern companion", orbiting the central engine at a distance of ~1,700 astronomical units and a period of >10,000 years. The binary at the centre of Apep is composed of two classical Wolf-Rayet stars of carbon- (WC8) and nitrogen-sequence (WN4-6b) subtypes, making Apep the strongest case of a classical WR+WR binary system in the Milky Way. Carbon-sequence Wolf-Rayet stars are often dust-making factories. A vast complex of stellar wind and cosmic dust surrounds the system, resembling WR 104, another Wolf-Rayet star system producing a pinwheel nebula. This component produces faster stellar winds from its poles and slower winds from its equator, and the equatorial wind's interaction with the wind of its secondary produces the system's "pinwheel" shape. Rapidly-rotating Wolf–Rayet stars are theoretically capable of producing a gamma-ray burst during a supernova, and the system has been identified as a progenitor for a gamma-ray burst. Apep is estimated to be at a distance of ~2.4 kiloparsecs, or ~8,000 light years, from Earth, with a potential discrepancy of +0.2 and −0.5 kiloparsecs at its estimated visual extinction of 11.4.

Observation 

The total apparent magnitude of the system is 17.5, with the apparent magnitude of a resolved central engine and northern companion being 19.0 and 17.8 respectively. Its infrared spectral energy distribution (SED) is unique, with brightness ranging from an apparent magnitude of 6.4 at 2.2 µm to −2.4 at 22 µm. SINFONI observations further detailed that the northern companion is possibly a conventional B1Ia+ high luminosity star. A and B show a typical spectrum from a WC7 star, but with additional WN4 or WN5 star features theorised to be from one of the stars of the central engine; if confirmed, this would make Apep a rare binary system of WR stars. An alternative hypothesis also based on SINFONI data proposes that the spectra could all be from an unusual transitional WN/WC star, and that the northern companion would then be a conventional OB star. Combining the spectra of the WR stars EZ Canis Majoris and WR 90 would produce a spectrum almost identical to the one observed of the WR binary.

The system was the first gamma-ray burst progenitor candidate to be discovered in the Milky Way galaxy, although it had not been known as such in early observations, such as those with the XMM-Newton and Chandra space telescopes, where it had been identified simply as an X-ray source as early as August 2004. Astronomer Joe Callingham first observed Apep during undergraduate studies at the University of Sydney with the Molonglo Observatory Synthesis Telescope, and was noted as a potential colliding-wind binary, with a radio source as bright as Eta Carinae. Callingham and Peter Tuthill, who led the discovery of WR 104 in 1998 and sought interest in Apep after observing its extreme infrared properties, used the ESO's Very Large Telescope for observations in August 2016. Further observations with the Anglo-Australian Telescope and the Australia Telescope Compact Array, along with contributions from various international institutions, led to the publication of a scientific paper in Nature Astronomy on 19 November 2018. It concluded that the system was a Wolf–Rayet binary and a progenitor for a gamma-ray burst. It had been previously assumed that such systems were only found in galaxies younger than the Milky Way.

See also 

 List of gamma-ray bursts

References 
Notes

Sources

 
 
 

Citations

External links 

 Anisotropic winds in a Wolf–Rayet binary identify a potential gamma-ray burst progenitor  at Nature Astronomy

Astronomical objects discovered in 2016
Binary stars
Norma (constellation)
Pinwheel nebulae
Stars with proper names
Wolf–Rayet stars